The Caledonia Corvairs are a Canadian junior ice hockey team based in Caledonia, Ontario, Canada.  They played in the Golden Horseshoe Conference of the Greater Ontario Junior Hockey League. The team announced it would not participate in the 2018–19 season.

However the team returned to the GOJHL for the 2019-20 season with an entirety new group of players.

On May 23, 2012, the Brantford Eagles were transplanted to Caledonia, Ontario, and renamed the Caledonia Corvairs, the name of the long running Junior C team in the town.  The Eagles had been one of the most dominant teams in Junior B for the previous four seasons but lacked crowd support.

History

Prior to the Brantford Eagles, a former Junior C team called the Brantford Penguins joined the Southwestern Junior B Hockey League in 1976.  After two seasons, the SWJBHL folded and the Penguins jumped to the Golden Horseshoe Junior Hockey League.  In 1984, the Brantford Alexander B's were Golden Horseshoe Champions.  In 1986, the Alexander B's were infamously suspended from playing in the 1986–87 season in a crackdown against violence by the Ontario Hockey Association.  The team was rebranded the Brantford Classics in 1987 and jumped to the Mid-Western Junior Hockey League. The Classics were very competitive until they relocated to Ohsweken, Ontario, and became the Ohsweken Golden Eagles in 1992. The team would not have another winning season until 2005–06 and missed the playoffs six consecutive years in that time. In 1998, the team was renamed the Brant County Golden Eagles and returned to Brantford in 2002 still as the Golden Eagles. The name was shorted in 2008 to just the Eagles and the team performance turned around. In the newly formed Greater Ontario Junior Hockey League's Mid-Western Conference, the Eagles put up 157 victories in 205 games, three conference titles, and the 2009 Sutherland Cup as OHA and GOJHL Champions.

On May 23, 2012, the team was relocated and renamed the Caledonia Corvairs.  After a first-place finish in the 2012–13 in the Mid-Western Conference, the Corvairs applied to transfer to the Golden Horseshoe Conference to play against teams closer to their area.

Season-by-season results

Sutherland Cup appearances
2009: Brantford Eagles defeated Stoney Creek Warriors 4-games-to-1
2010: LaSalle Vipers defeated Brantford Eagles 4-games-to-1
2012: St. Catharines Falcons defeated Brantford Eagles 4-games-to-2
2014: Caledonia Corvairs defeated St. Catharines Falcons 4-games-to-3
2015: Caledonia Corvairs defeated LaSalle Vipers 4-games-to-2
2016: Caledonia Corvairs defeated London Nationals 4-games-to-0
2018: Listowel Cyclones defeated Caledonia Corvairs 4-games-to-0

George S. Dudley Trophy Super "C" appearances
1976: Woodstock Navy-Vets defeated Brantford Penguins 4-games-to-none

See also
Caledonia Corvairs (1961–2012)

References

External links
Corvairs Webpage
GOJHL Webpage

Ice hockey teams in Ontario
2012 establishments in Ontario